Leonardo Dei Tos (born 27 April 1992) is an Italian male racewalker, who won two Italian Athletics Championships and competed at the 2016 IAAF World Race Walking Team Championships.

Achievements

National titles
 Italian Athletics Championships
 50 km walk: 2018
 Italian Athletics Indoor Championships
 5000 metres walk: 2015

References

External links
 

1992 births
Living people
Italian male racewalkers
21st-century Italian people